Fairfax is both a surname of English (Yorkshire and Northumberland, with a few branches later settling in Scotland) origin which means "fair hair", and a given name. Notable people with the name include:

Surname:
 Alan Fairfax (1906–1955), Australian cricketer
 Daphne Fairfax, a British comedian
 Edward Fairfax, translator
 Henry Fairfax (Royal Navy officer), British Admiral and Naval Commander K.C.B., F.R.G.S., 
 James Fairfax (1933–2017), Australian businessman and philanthropist
 John Fairfax (disambiguation), name of several notable people
 John Fairfax (delegate) (1762-1843), manager for George Washington
 John Fairfax (minister) (1623–1700), English ejected minister
 John Fairfax, 11th Lord Fairfax of Cameron (1830–1900), British peer with American citizenship
 John Fairfax (poet) (1930–2009), English poet
 John Fairfax (rower) (1937–2012), British ocean rower and adventurer
 Justin Fairfax, American Democratic politician and lieutenant governor of Virginia
 Lance Fairfax (1894–1974), New Zealand baritone in Australia
 Lettice Fairfax (1876-1948)
 Lettice Helen Compton Mackenzie    Fairfax(1898-2010) English Shakespearean & classical actress.
 Lettice Coutte Mackenzie Campbell fairfax (1923-1959) English Shakespearean actress
 Lettice Coutte Mackenzie Campbell Fairfax (1959-) English actress TV & stage
 Robert Fairfax (disambiguation), several people:
 Robert Fairfax, 7th Lord Fairfax of Cameron (1707–1793)
 Robert Fairfax (rear-admiral) (1666–1725)
 Robert Fayrfax (1464–1521), English Renaissance composer
 Ruth Fairfax, first president of the Queensland Country Women's Association
 Russell Fairfax, Australian rugby league footballer
 Thomas Fairfax, 3rd Lord Fairfax of Cameron, parliamentarian general in the English Civil War
 Thomas Fairfax (Gilling), 16th-century owner of Gilling Castle, North Yorkshire
 Warwick Oswald Fairfax, (1901–1987), Australian businessman, journalist and playwright
 Warwick Fairfax (born 1960), Australian businessman, son of W. O. Fairfax
 William Fairfax, 18th-century colonial official and plantation owner in Virginia
 William George Fairfax, a vice-admiral in the Royal Navy
 Lord Fairfax of Cameron (multiple individuals), a title in the Peerage of Scotland
 Viscount Fairfax of Emley (multiple individuals), a title in the Peerage of Ireland

Given name:
 Fairfax M. Cone (1903–1977), American businessman
 Fairfax Downey (1893–1990), American writer and military historian
 Fairfax Fenwick (1852–1920), New Zealand cricketer
 Fairfax Harrison (1869–1938), American president of Southern Railway and author
 Sir Fairfax Moresby (1786–1877), Royal Navy officer

Fictional characters:

 Gavin Fairfax, a character played by John D. Collins on the British sitcom series 'Allo 'Allo!
 Colonel Fairfax, a character in the Gilbert and Sullivan comic opera The Yeomen of the Guard.
 Mrs. Fairfax, a character in Charlotte Brontë's novel Jane Eyre
 Jane Fairfax, a character in Jane Austen's novel Emma
 Gwendolyn Fairfax, a character in Oscar Wilde's play The Importance of Being Earnest

See also
Fairfax (disambiguation)

References

English-language surnames
Surnames of Scottish origin